Leonard Hodgson (24 October 1889 in Fulham, London – 15 July 1969 in Leamington Spa) was an Anglican priest, philosopher, theologian, historian of the early Church and Regius Professor of Divinity at the University of Oxford from 1944 to 1958.

Early life 
Hodgson was the son of Walter Hodgson (1853–1934), a shorthand writer to the House of Lords and the House of Commons, and of his wife Lillias Emma, a daughter of William Shaw of County Durham. He was educated at St Paul's School, London, and Hertford College, Oxford, where he took a second in Classical Moderations (Greek and Latin) in 1910, a first in Greats (Philosophy and Ancient History) in 1912 and a first in Theology in 1913. He then trained for the ministry at St Michael's College, Llandaff.

Career
He was ordained a deacon of the Church of England in 1913, after a year at Llandaff. He served briefly as a curate at St Mark's Church, Portsmouth, then in 1914, in a meteoric promotion, he became vice-principal of St Edmund Hall, Oxford. In 1919 he was elected tutor in theology and dean of divinity at Magdalen College, Oxford. He was appointed professor of Christian apologetics the General Theological Seminary, New York City, in 1925. He was a canon of Winchester from 1931 to 1938, when he was elected as Regius Professor of Moral and Pastoral Theology and canon of Christ Church, Oxford.

During the 1930s he became an active ecumenist and served on the Anglican Council on Foreign Relations. He was also general secretary of the Edinburgh world conference on faith and order in 1937. From 1944 to 1958, he was Oxford's Regius Professor of Divinity. Twice nominated for episcopal office, he declined to become Bishop of Carlisle, and also refused the bishopric of Monmouth in 1940 in a move which some in the Church in Wales believe deprived the Province of a new and invigorating presence among its prelates. He delivered the Gifford lectures, For Faith and Freedom, from 1955 to 1957 at Glasgow University. From 1954 until 1966 (some of this time overlapping with his positions in Oxford) he was Warden of William Temple College, Rugby. In his book Sex and Christian Freedom (1967) he tried to "talk twentieth-century common sense without being disloyal to our ordination vows".

Career summary
Curate of St Mark's Church, Portsmouth, 1913–1914
Vice-Principal of St Edmund Hall, Oxford, 1914–1919
Examining chaplain to the Bishop of Lichfield, 1917 to 1925
Official Fellow and Dean of Divinity, Magdalen College, Oxford, 1919–1925
Professor of Christian Apologetics, General Theological Seminary, New York City, 1925–1931
Residentiary Canon of Winchester Cathedral 1931–1938
Examining chaplain to the Bishop of Winchester, 1932 to 1939
Theological Secretary to the Commission on Faith and Order of the World Council of Churches, 1933 to 1952
Regius Professor of Moral and Pastoral Theology and Canon of Christ Church, Oxford, 1938–1944
Regius Professor of Divinity and Canon of Christ Church, Oxford, 1944–1958
Warden of William Temple College, Rugby, 1954–1966
Member of council of St David's College, Lampeter

Family
In 1917, Hodgson proposed unsuccessfully to the novelist Dorothy L. Sayers. On 7 April 1920 he married Ethel Margaret du Plat (1888–1960), the daughter of the Rev. C. F. Archer, Rector of Moy, County Tyrone. They had a son and a daughter.

Major publications
The Place of Reason in Christian Apologetic (1925) 
 
And was Made Man: An Introduction to the Study of the Gospels (1928)
Essays in Christian Philosophy (1930)
Eugenics (1933) 
The Lord's Prayer (1934) 
Democracy and Dictatorship in the Light of Christian Faith (1935) 
The Grace of God in Faith and Philosophy (Paddock lectures, 1936)
This War and the Christian (1939)
The Christian Idea of Liberty (1941) 
Towards a Christian Philosophy (1942) 
The Doctrine of the Trinity (1943) (1942-1943 Croall Lectures, New College, Edinburgh)
Theology in an Age of Science (1944)
The Doctrine of the Church (1946) 
Biblical Theology and the Sovereignty of God (1947) 
Christian Faith and Practice (1950) 
The Doctrine of the Atonement (1951) 
For Faith and Freedom (1956) (1955–57 Gifford Lectures, Glasgow; 1968 edition: Vol. 1, Vol. 2)
Church and Sacraments in Divided Christendom (1959) 
The Bible and the Training of the Clergy (1963) 
Sex and Christian Freedom (1967)

Honours
Hon. Doctor of Civil Laws, Bishop's University, Lennoxville, Canada, 1929
Hon. Doctor of Sacred Theology, General Theological Seminary, New York City, 1931
Doctor of Divinity, Oxford University, 1938
Hon. Doctor of Divinity, Edinburgh University, 1938 
Hon. Doctor of Divinity, Glasgow University, 1956
Hon. fellow of St Edmund Hall, Oxford, 1957
Hon. fellow of Selwyn College, Cambridge, 1957
Emeritus Student, Christ Church, Oxford, 1959

References

Further reading
Hodgson, Leonard (1889–1969), theologian by Mark D. Chapman in Oxford Dictionary of National Biography
HODGSON, Rev. Leonard, DD STD Hon. DCL in Who Was Who 1897–2006

1889 births
1969 deaths
Alumni of Hertford College, Oxford
20th-century English Anglican priests
Fellows of Magdalen College, Oxford
Fellows of St Edmund Hall, Oxford
Fellows of Selwyn College, Cambridge
People educated at St Paul's School, London
English Christian theologians
English Anglican theologians
Regius Professors of Divinity (University of Oxford)
Regius Professors of Moral and Pastoral Theology
Alumni of St Michael's College, Llandaff
General Theological Seminary faculty
20th-century English philosophers